Weightlifting, for the 2017 Bolivarian Games, took place from 18 November to 22 November 2017. Colombia took 28 gold medals to win the event.

Medal table

Medalists
PR – Pan American record

Men 

* In 85 kg, originally Arley Méndez won a gold medal in all three events (snatch: 171 kg, clean & jerk: 211 kg and total: 382 kg), but after the competition the Venezuelan team protest against him, because he not held his Chilean passport long enough to be eligible at the Bolivarian Games.

Women

References

2017 in weightlifting
2017 Bolivarian Games